Daniele Mignanelli (born 10 May 1993) is an Italian footballer  who plays as a defender for  club Juve Stabia.

Club career
On 15 January 2019, he signed with Viterbese.

On 7 August 2019, he signed with Carrarese.

On 30 July 2020, he joined Modena.

On 16 July 2021 he signed a two-year contract with Avellino.

On 10 August 2022, Mignanelli moved to Juve Stabia on a two-year contract.

References

1993 births
Living people
People from Cantù
Footballers from Lombardy
Italian footballers
Association football defenders
Serie B players
Serie C players
Serie D players
Calcio Lecco 1912 players
Aurora Pro Patria 1919 players
A.C. Reggiana 1919 players
Delfino Pescara 1936 players
Ascoli Calcio 1898 F.C. players
U.S. Viterbese 1908 players
Carrarese Calcio players
Modena F.C. players
U.S. Avellino 1912 players
S.S. Juve Stabia players
Sportspeople from the Province of Como